[[Image:Benjamin West 005.jpg|thumbnail|right|300px|'The Death of General Wolfe  by Benjamin West. Oil on canvas, 1770.]]List of conflicts in Canada' is a timeline of events that includes wars, battles, skirmishes, major terrorist attacks, riots and other related items that have occurred in the country of Canada's current geographical area. A complete list of terrorist attacks can be found at terrorism in Canada.

Before the 16th century
 The 11th Century 
1003 Battle of Vinland (1003)
1006 Skirmishes between Norsemen and Skræling, the ancestors of the Beothuk.
1010 Battle of Vinland (1010)

16th Century
1577 Skirmishes between English sailors under Martin Frobisher and the Inuit on Baffin Island

17th century

17th century Beaver Wars
1610 Battle of Sorel
1628 Action of 17 July 1628
1644 Action at Ville-Marie
1649 Raid on St. Ignace and St. Louis
1660 Battle of Long Sault
1689 Lachine massacre
1691 Battle of La Prairie
1692 Mohawk Valley raid
17th century Anglo-French conflicts
1613 Battle of Port Royal
1628 Capture of Tadoussac
1628 Naval action in the St. Lawrence River
1629 Surrender of Quebec
1629 Siege of Baleine
1630 Siege of Fort St. Louis
1632 Raid on St. John
1635 – 1650 Acadian Civil War
1640 Battle of Port Royal
1642 Blockade at St. John
1643 Battle of Penobscot
1643 Battle of Port Royal
1645 Siege of St. John
1654 Battle of Port Royal
1686 Hudson Bay expedition
1688 Battle of Fort Albany
1640 – 1701 French and Iroquois Wars
1692 Battle of Fort Vercheres
1645 Battle of Fort La Tour
1674 Dutch Occupation of Acadia
1677 Battle of Port La Tour
17th century Second Anglo-Dutch War
1664 Dutch capture of St. John's
1689 – 1697 King William's War
1689 Battle of the Lake of Two Mountains
1690 Battle of Coulée Grou
1690 Battle of Port Royal
1690 Battle at Chedabucto
1690 Battle of Quebec
1693 Battle of Fort Albany
1694 Capture of York Factory
1696 Naval action in the Bay of Fundy
1696 Raid on Chignecto
1696 Siege of Fort Nashwaak
1696 – 1697 Avalon Peninsula Campaign
1696 Siege of Ferryland
1696 Raid on Petty Harbour
1696 Siege of St. John's
1697 Battle of Carbonear
1697 Battle of Hudson's Bay

18th century
1702 – 1713 Queen Anne's War
1702 Newfoundland expedition
1704 Raid on Chignecto
1704 Raid on Grand Pré
1705 Siege of St. John's
1707 Siege of Port Royal
1709 Battle of St. John's
1709 Battle of Fort Albany
1710 Siege of Port Royal
1711 Battle of Bloody Creek

1722 – 1725 Father Rale's War
1722 Battle of Winnepang
1723 Raid on Canso
1724 Raid on Annapolis Royal
1725 Raid on Canso
1744 – 1748 King George's War
1744 Raid on Canso
1744 Siege of Fort Anne
1745 Siege of Port Toulouse
1745 Siege of Louisbourg
1746 Battle at Port-la-Joye
1747 Battle of Grand Pré
1749 – 1755 Father Le Loutre's War
1749 Raid on Dartmouth
1749 Siege of Grand Pre
1749-1750 Battles at Chignecto
1750 Battle at St. Croix
1751 Raid on Dartmouth
1751 Raid on Chignecto
1751 Raids on Halifax
1753 Attack at Country Harbour
1753 The Lunenburg Rebellion
1754 – 1763 Seven Years' War
1755 Naval Action off Newfoundland
1755 Battle of Fort Beauséjour
1755 Bay of Fundy Campaign
1755 Battle of Petitcodiac
1756 Raid on Lunenburg
1757 Battle on Snowshoes - occurred in the British Province of New York and New France.
1757 Battle of Bloody Creek
1758 Siege of Louisbourg
1758 Battle of Fort Frontenac
1758 Gulf of St. Lawrence Campaign
1758 Île Saint-Jean Campaign
1758 Petitcodiac River Campaign
1758 Battle on Snowshoes - occurred in the British Province of New York and New France.
1759 St. John River Campaign
1759 Battle of Beauport
1759 Battle of the Plains of Abraham
1759 St. Francis Raid
1760 Battle of Sainte-Foy
1760 Siege of Quebec
1760 Battle of Neuville
1760 Battle of Restigouche
1760 Montreal Campaign
1760 Battle of the Thousand Islands
1762 Battle of Signal Hill
1763 – 1766 Pontiac's War
1763 Battle of Point Pelee
1775 – 1776 American Revolutionary War
1775 Invasion of Quebec
1775 Arnold's expedition to Quebec
1775 Battle of Longue-Pointe
1775 Siege of Fort St. Jean
1775 Battle of Quebec
1776 Battle of the Cedars
1776 Battle of Saint-Pierre
1776 Battle of Trois-Rivières
1776 Battle of Fort Cumberland
1777 Siege of Saint John
1781 Naval battle off Cape Breton
1782 Naval battle off Halifax
1782 Raid on Lunenburg
1782 Hudson Bay Expedition
1789 Nootka Crisis
1792 Destruction of Opitsaht
1792-1797 War of the First Coalition
1796 Newfoundland expedition
1793 Raids on Pine Island Fort
1794 Attack on South Branch House

19th century
1800 United Irish Uprising in Newfoundland
1811 Tonquin incident
1812 War of 1812

1812 Raid on Gananoque
1812 Battle of Queenston Heights
1812 Naval action off Kingston
1812 Battle of Lacolle Mills
1813 Raid on Elizabethtown
1813 Battle of York
1813 Battle of Fort George
1813 Battle of Stoney Creek
1813 Battle of Beaver Dams
1813 Capture of the Growler and the Julia
1813 Battle of Chateauguay
1813 The "Burlington Races"
1813 Battle of River Canard
1813 Battle of the Thames
1813 Massequoi Village
1813 Battle of Crysler's Farm
1814 Battle of Longwoods
1814 Battle of Lacolle Mills
1814 Battle of Odelltown
1814 Raid on Port Dover
1814 Capture of Fort Erie
1814 Battle of Chippawa
1814 Battle of Lundy's Lane
1814 Siege of Fort Erie
1814 Engagements on Lake Huron
1814 Action at Nottawasaga
1814 Capture of the Tigress and the Scorpion
1814 Capture of Fort Erie
1814 Siege of Fort Erie
1814 Battle of Cook's Mills
1814 Battle of Malcolm's Mills
1816 Pemmican War
1816 Capture of Fort Gibraltar
1816 Battle of Seven Oaks
1816 Capture of Fort Douglas
1816 Capture of Fort William
1835 – 1845 Shiners' War
1837 – 1838 Lower Canada Rebellion
1837 Battle of Saint-Denis
1837 Battle of Saint-Charles
1837 Battle of Saint-Eustache
1838 Battle of Lacolle
1838 Battle of Odelltown
1838 Battle of Beauharnois
1837 – 1838 Upper Canada Rebellion
1837 Battle of Montgomery's Tavern
1838 Battle of Pelee Island
1838 Short Hills Raid
1838 Battle of the Windmill
1838 Battle of Windsor
1838 Aroostook War
1838 Nicola's War
1849 Courthouse Rebellion
1849 Montreal Riots
1849 Stony Monday Riot
1858 Fraser Canyon Gold Rush skirmishes along the Okanagan Trail
1858 Fraser Canyon War
1859 McGowan's War
1859 Pig War
1863 Lamalcha War
1864 Chilcotin War
1864 Kingfisher Incident
1866 – 1871 Fenian Raids
1866 Battle of Ridgeway
1866 Battle of Fort Erie
1866 Battle of Pigeon Hill
1870 Battle of Eccles Hill
1870 Battle of Trout River
1867 Grouse Creek War
1869 – 1870 Red River Rebellion
1870 Wolseley Expedition
1870 Battle of the Belly River
1873 Cypress Hills Massacre
1875 Jubilee riots
1885 North-West Rebellion
1885 Battle of Duck Lake
1885 Frog Lake Massacre
1885 Battle of Fort Pitt
1885 Battle of Fish Creek
1885 Battle of Cut Knife
1885 Battle of Batoche
1885 Battle of Frenchman's Butte
1885 Battle of Loon Lake
1886 Anti-Chinese Riots
1887 Wild Horse Creek War
1895 Battle of Brennan's Hill also known as The Low Rebellion  

20th century
1902 June 22: Toronto Streetcar Strike riot
1907 Anti-Oriental Riots
1913 Vancouver Island War
1918 Conscription Crisis of 1917
1918 Vancouver General Strike
1919 Winnipeg General Strike
1925 New Waterford Rebellion. See Davis Day.
1931 Estevan riot
1933 Christie Pits riot
1935 Regina Riot
1935 Battle of Ballantyne Pier
1938 Bloody Sunday
1939 - 1945 Second World War
1939 - 1945 Battle of the Atlantic
1942 - 1944 Battle of the St. Lawrence
1942 Bombardment of Estevan Point lighthouse
1944 Terrace Mutiny
1945 Halifax riot
1955 Richard Riot
1967 Yorkville, Toronto riots
1969 Murray-Hill riot
1970 October Crisis
1971 Gastown Riots
1982 Squamish Five
1983 Solidarity Crisis
1990 Oka Crisis
1990 - 1992 Royal Oak Mines violent labour dispute
1993 Montreal Stanley Cup Riot
1994 Vancouver Stanley Cup Riot
1994 - 2002 Quebec Biker War
1995 Gustafsen Lake Standoff
1995 Ipperwash Crisis
1997 - 2000 Wiebo Ludwig bombings

21st century
2006 Caledonia land dispute
2009 Vancouver gang war
2010 2010 G20 Toronto summit protests
2011 Vancouver Stanley Cup riot
2012 Quebec student protests
2020 Canadian pipeline and railway protests
2022 Canada convoy protest

See also

Canada
Anglo-French conflicts on Hudson Bay
Canadian Armed Forces
Canadian militia
Canadian nationalism
Colonial militia in Canada
Indigenous conflicts in Canada
 History of Canadian foreign policy
List of Canadian military victories
List of Canadian military operations
List of massacres in Canada
List of wars involving Canada
Military history of Canada
Military of New France
Provincial Marine
Riots and civil disorder in Canada
Terrorism in Canada
Violence in Canada

International
American Indian Wars
List of battles (geographic)
List of conflicts in North America
List of wars

References

Further reading

Granatstein, J. (2010). The Oxford Companion to Canadian Military History''. Oxford University Press.

External links
Canadian War Museum: Chronology of War

Canada
Canada
Conflicts
Military history of Canada
Conflicts
Conflicts